Myriam Morea also known as Myriam Abel (born Myriam Abdel Hamid, 15 May 1981 in Saint-Gratien, France) is a French singer of Algerian descent who rose to popularity after winning Nouvelle Star 3, the French version of Pop Idol, shown by M6.

In 2011 and 2012 she competed in Les Anges de la télé-réalité.

Early career 
Myriam Abel began singing at the age of ten and, at the age of thirteen, participated in a singing competition. She then decided to take singing lessons at Les Voix d'Or with Indira Henni, who also became her artistic director. She then had her television debut on the program Je passe à la télé on 2 May 1997. The public vote for her was 93%.

Abel sang with various bands such as those of Gilles Pellegrini and René Coll. The young songwriter Tristan Fedoras noticed her and contacted Indira Henni in 1997. He wrote several songs for her. He also became her new manager before moving on to focus more on his own musical style. Together, they recorded their first songs. Abel entered a rising star competition with seventy singers in 1998 in Beaune (Côte-d'Or) and won. However, the producers decided that the show would then only become dedicated to juniors, which eliminated Myriam Abel. In December 1998, she recorded new songs composed by Tristan Fedoras and Corinne Calame. She was selected for the Golden Rose of Antibes Contest on 2 July 1999 where she finished second.

Abel was selected by Disney to record When She Loved Me for the French release of Toy Story 2 (the song was retitled Quand elle m'aimait encore on the official French soundtrack). She recorded the song under the name Myriam Morea and continued to use the pseudonym.

In January 2000, she attended the KKL party at the Palais des Sports, Lætitia Larusso's first party. There she met Gloria Gaynor's producers, whom she went on to work with for two years. With these producers, she recorded several songs including Comme je t'aime, which she performed at La Chance on 19 October 2000 but was not released as a single until 2001.

Donne and Qui je suis (2003-2011) 
In 2003, she rejoined the band Festival Mibely. During that time, she also auditioned for Nouvelle Star (the French version of Pop Idol), but was eliminated during the first stage selections in Marseille.

She won the third season of M6's tele-hook in June 2005. She thus gained the opportunity to record an album with Sony BMG. However, the contract she had previously signed with Outcom Production was made public, which violated the rules of the show, which was reserved for fans and did not allow professional singers. This also prevented the release of an album with Sony, though she released her first single Donne at the end of 2005. It was produced by Lara Fabian and Jean-Félix Lalanne. In addition, the song was removed from the airwaves by BMG due to legal issues before being broadcast again. The album La vie devant toi was finally released in December, 2005 and was the ninth bestselling album in France. Abel remade the song Baby Can I Hold You by Tracy Chapman in the summer of 2006. An album was reissued with that title, but did not meet massive success. Eventually, Donne only reached the status of a silver disc for selling more than 100,000 copies sold.

Her second studio album, Qui je suis, was released to stores on 31 January 2011. The album included tracks such as Trop vite and Le Cœur ailleurs. It topped at the 188th place in French rankings where it stayed for one week.

Personal life 
Miriam Abel and her partner, Roland, became parents when their son Roland Jr. was born in May, 2009.

Discography

Albums 
 26 December 2005: La Vie Devant Toi (#9 FR)
 31 January 2011 : Qui je suis (#110 FR)

Singles 
 6 January 2006 : Donne (#2 FR)
 26 June 2006 : Baby Can I Hold You (#33 FR)

References

External links 
  Official website

1981 births
Living people
French people of Algerian descent
French people of Berber descent
French people of Kabyle descent
Kabyle people
Nouvelle Star winners
21st-century French singers
21st-century French women singers